Sasa del Abadiado is a locality located in the municipality of Loporzano, in Huesca province, Aragon, Spain. As of 2020, it has a population of 34.

Geography 
Sasa del Abadiado is located 18km northeast of Huesca.

References

Populated places in the Province of Huesca